Viacheslav Volosov (Ukrainian: Вячеслав Волосов; born November 28, 1976 in Donetsk) is a Ukrainian bodybuilder, and personal trainer.

He placed 1st during the 2010 Lviv Cup in general category. The same year he was the absolute winner of WABBA European Bodybuilding Championships, as well as the runner-up WABBA's World Championships in "tall" category. He won FBBU Ukrainian Cup in 100+ kg category in 2012. Volosov also participated in 2012 IFBB European Amateur Championships where he placed 10th in super-heavyweight category.

References

External links 
 

1976 births
Living people
Ukrainian bodybuilders
Pro-Ukrainian people of the war in Donbas